Leonard Moore may refer to:

 Leonard P. Moore (1898–1982), federal appellate judge in the United States
 Leonard Moore (literary agent) (died 1959), literary agent
 Leonard W. Moore, founder and president of Moore Industries
 Lenny Moore, American football player
 Leon Moore (1871–1934), born Leonard David Moore, Australian cricketer